Lee Man-ki ( born in 1963) is a former champion Ssireum wrestler and Korean television personality.

Lee is married to Hyun Sook-hee, a Judo coach and former olympic athlete.

In 1983, Lee won his first Ssireum championship and went on to win ten times. Because of his domination of the sport during the 1980s, even decades later Lee is known as a legend in the sport alongside Kang Ho-dong. Lee retired from the sport in 1990.

Lee was a guest in a November 2010 episode of 2 Days & 1 Night, where he and Kang Ho-dong had a rematch of their famous 1990 championship game.

In 2021, Lee was a contestant in the tv show King of Mask Singer and simultaneously released a single of his original song titled "Good Friend".

Filmography

Television show

References

1963 births
Living people
South Korean male sport wrestlers
South Korean television presenters
South Korean ssireum practitioners